Winters Bros. is a privately held waste disposal business in the Northeast United States. Its headquarters are in West Babylon, New York; it currently serves the markets of New York and Connecticut, but previously also served Florida and Vermont. Outside of Long Island, the company brands itself as Oak Ridge Waste & Recycling. It sells its recovered products worldwide. It is the largest waste management firm in Long Island, and one of the largest in Connecticut. The firm has six recycling centers and twelve transfer stations.

Acquisitions 
Originally based in Long Island, in 2011, it purchased the 25 waste disposal companies formerly owned by James Galante to expand into the Connecticut market. The Connecticut headquarters is located in Danbury. In 2015, the firm acquired all the Connecticut and New York operations from Waste Management operations, and continues to service these regions under contract with WM. At various times, it purchased smaller waste management companies, the largest of which in the New York region being Progressive Waste Solutions, which Winters Bros. acquired in 2015.

Facilities

Winters Bros. has its largest facility located in West Babylon, NY which handles recycling, transfers, and hauling. Other transfer stations and yards in New York are in Glen Cove, NY, Medford, NY, Old Bethpage, NY, Holtsville, NY and Yaphank, NY. Its two facilities in Connecticut are in Danbury and Shelton.

Transportation 
In New York, Winters Bros. utilizes the Bushwick Branch rail line under contract with the New York and Atlantic Railway via the Waste Management company's Varick Transfer Station., In Connecticut, it utilizes the Housatonic Railroad's Maybrook Line.

Equipment 

Winters Bros. has a collection of over 200 vehicles, which include trucks for residential, commercial, industrial and construction pickups. Its normal trucks are equipped with robotic arms to collect trash bins and dumpsters without the need for workers to exit the vehicles. Flatbed trucks are used for special pickups that are too large for normal trucks, and hauling away construction waste.

Notes

External links
 Official website
 Oak Ridge website

American companies established in 1950
Waste companies established in 1950
Waste management companies of the United States
Companies based in Suffolk County, New York
Companies based in Danbury, Connecticut
1950 establishments in New York (state)